Luis Santamarina (25 June 1942 – 6 February 2017) was a Spanish cyclist. He competed in the team time trial at the 1964 Summer Olympics. He also rode in four editions of the Tour de France. He died on 6 February 2017, aged 74.

Major results

1966
9th Overall Vuelta a Andalucía
1st Stage 4
1967
 1st  Road race, National Road Championships
3rd Overall Tour de Suisse
1968
1st Stage 16 Vuelta a España
1st Stage 20 Giro d'Italia
2nd Overall Setmana Catalana de Ciclisme
4th Trofeo Dicen
8th Trofeo Juan Fina
1970
1st  Overall Tour of the Basque Country
1st  Overall Vuelta a Aragón
1st Stage 4a
9th Overall Vuelta a España
1st Stage 5
9th Overall Vuelta a los Valles Mineros
1971
2nd Overall Vuelta a Asturias
9th Overall Tour of the Basque Country
1972
1st Overall Vuelta a los Valles Mineros
1st Stage 2a
1st Stage 1 GP Leganes
2nd Overall Vuelta Ciclista a La Rioja
2nd Overall Vuelta a Asturias
8th Overall Volta a Catalunya

References

External links
 

1942 births
2017 deaths
People from Abanto y Ciérbana-Abanto Zierbena
Spanish male cyclists
Olympic cyclists of Spain
Cyclists from the Basque Country (autonomous community)
Cyclists at the 1964 Summer Olympics
Sportspeople from Biscay